Northrop is a neighborhood in the Nokomis community in Minneapolis, Minnesota, United States. Its boundaries are 42nd Street to the north, Cedar Avenue to the east, Minnehaha Parkway to the south, and Chicago Avenue to the west. It shares a neighborhood organization with the Field and Regina neighborhoods.

References

External links
Minneapolis Neighborhood Profile - Northrop
Field Regina Northrop Neighborhood Group

Neighborhoods in Minneapolis